Catfish: The TV Show is an American television series that began airing on MTV on November 12, 2012. The second series began airing on June 25, 2013. Season 3 and Season 4 premiered respectively on May 7, 2014 and February 25, 2015. Season 5 began airing on February 24, 2016. Season 8 premiered on January 8, 2020. The second part of the eighth season premiered on August 5, 2020 and featured the first virtual episodes of the series due to the COVID-19 pandemic.

Series overview

Episodes

Season 1 (2012–2013)

Season 2 (2013)

Season 3 (2014)

Season 4 (2015)
Note: Max Joseph is absent for episodes 1-5 and 17-18 due to his work on his film, We Are Your Friends.

Season 5 (2016)

Season 6 (2017)
Note: Nev Schulman is absent in episodes 5-6 due to paternity leave.

Season 7 (2018–2019)

Season 8 (2020–2023)

References

Lists of American non-fiction television series episodes